Paquito is a given name, may refer to:
Paquito Cordero (1932–2009), Puerto Rican comedian
Paquito Diaz, (1937–2011), veteran Filipino actor and movie director
Paquito D'Rivera (born 1948), Cuban clarinetist and saxophonist
Paquito Ochoa, Jr. (born 1960), Philippine Executive Secretary under the Administration of President Benigno Aquino III 
Anderson Luiz Pinheiro (born 1981), Brazilian footballer
Juliano Pescarolo Martins (born 1974), Brazilian footballer
Francisco García Gómez (born 1938), Spanish international footballer and coach